Akram Hussein Chehayeb (born 17 October 1947) is a Lebanese Druze politician who is a member of the Progressive Socialist Party headed by Walid Jumblatt. Cheheyab is a long-term member of the parliament and has also served in different cabinet and parliamentary posts.

Early life and education

Chehayeb was born in Aley on 17 October 1947. He received a bachelor's degree in biology from the Arab University of Beirut and a master's degree in history from Cairo University in 1982.

Career
Chehayeb was a supporter of the Baath party and Saddam Hussein during his youth. Then he became a member of the Progressive Socialist Party (PSP) in 1979. He worked as a history professor at Lebanese University in Aley. In 1984, he became office manager of Jumblatt. From 1985 to 1991 he served as the director of the PSP in Damascus. In 1992, he won the election, being a representative for Beirut. In the 1996 elections, Chehayeb won the Druze seat in Aley. Chahayeb served as minister of environment from 1996 to 1998. He also won the same seat in the general elections of 2000. From 2005 to 2009 he was the head of Lebanese environment committee. In 2009, he was appointed minister of displaced to the cabinet headed by then prime minister Saad Hariri, replacing Raymond Audi. Chehayeb's tenure ended in 2011, and he was succeeded by Alaaeddine Terro as minister.

Chehayeb also won Druze seat in Aley in the 2009 general election, and is part of the National Struggle Front bloc, which is under the control of Walid Jumblatt.

In February 2013 Akram Chehayeb became part of Tammam Salam's government as minister of agriculture. His term ended on 18 December 2016 when a new government led by Saad Hariri was formed.

Personal life
Chehayeb is married to Salma Jurdi Chehayeb and has four children.

References

External links

1947 births
Living people
People from Aley District
Beirut Arab University alumni
Cairo University alumni
Lebanese Druze
Academic staff of Lebanese University
Progressive Socialist Party politicians
Agriculture ministers of Lebanon
Displaced ministers of Lebanon
Education ministers of Lebanon
Environment ministers of Lebanon
Higher education ministers of Lebanon
Members of the Parliament of Lebanon